Hungry Bird is the sixth album by indie rock band Clem Snide. The album was recorded in 2006 and released on the 429 Records label on February 24, 2009 in both the U.S. and U.K. Lead singer Eef Barzelay has described it as a "loosely-conceived, post-apocalyptic fairytale."

Track listing
 Me No
 Born A Man
 Hum
 Burn the Light
 Encounter At 3AM
 The Endless Endings
 Our Time Will Come
 Beard of Bees
 Pray
 With All My Heart

References

2009 albums
Clem Snide albums
429 Records albums